is a Japanese voice actress from Tokyo,  Japan. She voices Guren in Naruto: Shippuden, and Kana in Haibane Renmei.

Filmography

Anime television
 Kero Kero Chime (1997), Pika Pika
 Popolocrois Monogatari (1998), Hyuu 
 The Big O (1999)
 Wild Arms: Twilight Venom (1999), Sybil
 ATASHIn'CHI (2002), Fukuzawa
 Haibane Renmei (2002), Kana
 Kaleido Star (2003), Alice 
 Mushi-Shi (2005), Mio (ep 22)
 Naruto Shippūden (2007), Guren
 Kaze no Stigma (2007), Mayumi Tsuwabuki (eps 9–12)
 Durarara!! (2010), Yōko
 High School of the Dead (2010), News Reporter (eps 2–3)
 Yu-Gi-Oh! Zexal (2011), Mirai Tsukumo

Original video animations
 Sol Bianca: The Legacy (1999), June Ashel

Dubbing

Live-action
 Jessica Alba
 Fantastic Four (Susan Storm / Invisible Woman)
 Fantastic Four: Rise of the Silver Surfer (Susan Storm / Invisible Woman)
 Spy Kids: All the Time in the World (Marissa Wilson)
 Some Kind of Beautiful (Kate)
 The Veil (Maggie Price)
 28 Days Later (Hannah (Megan Burns))
 28 Weeks Later (Major Scarlet Levy (Rose Byrne))
 500 Days of Summer (Summer Finn (Zooey Deschanel))
 Absentia (Alice Durand (Cara Theobold))
 American Made (Lucy Seal (Sarah Wright))
 Army of the Dead (Maria Cruz (Ana de la Reguera))
 Army of Thieves (Maria Cruz (Ana de la Reguera))
 Bangkok Dangerous (Aom (Panward Hemmanee))
 Bella Martha (Lea (Katja Studt))
 Bring It On: All or Nothing (Britney Allen (Hayden Panettiere))
 Bullet to the Head (Lisa Bonomo (Sarah Shahi))
 Casper (2004 DVD edition) (Kathleen "Kat" Harvey (Christina Ricci))
 Chicago Med (Dr. Natalie Manning (Torrey DeVitto))
 Coffee Prince (Han Yoo-joo (Chae Jung-an))
 Cold Comes the Night (Chloe (Alice Eve))
 The Curse of La Llorona (Anna Tate-Garcia (Linda Cardellini))
 Dark Phoenix (Elaine Grey (Hannah Anderson))
 Designated Survivor (First Lady Alex Kirkman (Natascha McElhone))
 Elysium (Frey Santiago (Alice Braga))
 Fires (Lally Robinson (Anna Torv))
 First Daughter (Samantha MacKenzie (Katie Holmes))
 Four Christmases (Kate (Reese Witherspoon))
 Fringe (Olivia Dunham (Anna Torv))
 Gentlemen Broncos (Tabatha Jenkins (Halley Feiffer))
 Get Smart's Bruce and Lloyd: Out of Control (Isabella (Marika Domińczyk))
 Good People (Anna Wright (Kate Hudson))
 Guardians of the Galaxy (Meredith Quill (Laura Haddock))
 Guardians of the Galaxy Vol. 2 (Meredith Quill (Laura Haddock))
 Houdini (Bess Houdini (Kristen Connolly))
 I See You (Jackie Harper (Helen Hunt))
 Infestation (Sara (Brooke Nevin))
 The Invisible (Annelie "Annie" Newton (Margarita Levieva))
 Kung Fu Yoga (Ashmita (Disha Patani))
 Lost Girl (Bo Dennis (Anna Silk))
 Miss March (Cindi Whitehall (Raquel Alessi))
 Mr. Mercedes (Deborah Hartsfield (Kelly Lynch))
 Paranormal Activity 3 (Julie (Lauren Bittner))
Peninsula (Min-jung (Lee Jung-hyun))
 Poseidon (Jennifer Ramsey (Emmy Rossum))
 School of Rock (Lawrence "Mr. Cool" (Robert Tsai))
 The Search (Carole (Bérénice Bejo))
 Shazam! (Eugene Choi (Ian Chen))
 Shutter Island (Dolores Chanal (Michelle Williams))
 Source Code (Christina Warren (Michelle Monaghan))
 Sunshine (Cassie (Rose Byrne))
 Timeline (Kate Ericson (Frances O'Connor))
 Walk the Line (June Carter (Reese Witherspoon))
 Wild (Cheryl Strayed (Reese Witherspoon))

Animation
 Atlantis: Milo's Return (Audrey)
 DC League of Super-Pets (Wonder Woman)
 Delgo (Princess Kyla)
 Hello Kitty's Furry Tale Theater (Tuxedo Sam)

References

External links
 Eri Miyajima at Media Force
 Eri Miyajima at Production Baobab (Archive by WaybackMachine)
 

Japanese voice actresses
1974 births
Living people
Voice actresses from Tokyo
Production Baobab voice actors